Gabriel Bitar (born August 23, 1998) is a professional footballer who plays as a midfielder or forward for Canadian club Vancouver FC. Born in Canada, he represents the Lebanon national team.

Early life
Bitar began playing soccer with the Ottawa Internationals at age four. He later joined the Ottawa Fury Academy.

University career
In 2017, Bitar began attending Carleton University playing for the men's soccer team. In his first year, he was the top scorer in the country with 16 goals, as he won the OUA East Division Rookie of the Year, OUA East Division MVP, and U Sports Rookie of the Year awards and was named a First Team All-Canadian and First-Team OUA East All-Star, helping the Ravens to an OUA silver medal, scoring an additional four goals during the national tournament.

In 2018, he finished third in the OUA in goals with 13 and added another 5 in the national tournament, while being named a Second Team All-Canadian and First Team OUA All-Star, as the Ravens won the bronze medal at the national championship. In 2019, Bitar was a First Team OUA All-Star and Second Team All-Canadian.

After the 2020 season was cancelled due to the COVID-19 pandemic, Bitar returned for 2021, helping the Ravens win a silver medal at the national championships, while being named a Tournament All-Star as well as an OUA East All-Star during the season.

Club career

Early career
Bitar was part of the Ottawa Fury FC Academy and played for their Première ligue de soccer du Québec team in 2015 and 2016. In 2017, Bitar played for League1 Ontario side Ottawa South United, scoring six goals in thirteen league appearances, and playing once in the L1O Cup.

Cavalry FC
Bitar was the first overall draft pick in the inaugural CPL–U Sports Draft, where he was picked by Cavalry FC of the Canadian Premier League on November 12, 2018. He signed with the club on April 24, 2019. He made his debut for Cavalry against Pacific FC in a Canadian Championship match on May 16. In August 2019, Cavalry announced that Bitar would return to Carleton University for the 2019 USports season. He was picked again by Cavalry in the 2019 CPL–U Sports Draft, this time sixth overall, but he did not join them for the 2020 season.

Ottawa South United
In 2020, he returned to Ottawa South United, who moved from League1 Ontario to the Première Ligue de soccer du Québec, where he previously played when he was a member of the Ottawa Fury Academy.

Ansar
On July 4, 2021, Bitar moved to Ansar in the Lebanese Premier League on trial for the 2021 Lebanese Elite Cup. He made his debut on July 12, scoring a brace against Akhaa Ahli Aley in the group stage. Bitar scored his third goal against Ahed on July 16. Despite scoring three goals in two games, Bitar decided not to sign a contract with Ansar, due to the economic situation in Lebanon.

FC Edmonton
On March 28, 2022, Bitar returned to the Canadian Premier League, signing with FC Edmonton. With Edmonton, he switched positions from his typical forward role to being deployed primarily as a midfielder. He scored his first goal on June 27, in a 3–1 defeat to former club Cavalry FC.

Vancouver FC
In January 2023, Bitar signed with expansion side Vancouver FC.

International career
Bitar is eligible to represent Canada, through birth, and Lebanon through descent, as both his parents are from the capital Beirut.

Canada
In September 2015, Bitar participated in an identification camp for the Canada national under-20 team.

Lebanon
In December 2022, Bitar accepted a call-up to the Lebanon national team for a friendly game against the United Arab Emirates (UAE). He made his debut on December 30 as a substitute in the match, in an eventual 1–0 defeat.

Career statistics

Club

International

Honours
Individual
 Lebanese Elite Cup top goalscorer: 2021

See also
 List of Lebanon international footballers born outside Lebanon

Notes

References

External links
 

1998 births
Living people
Soccer players from Ottawa
Canadian soccer players
Lebanese footballers
Canadian people of Lebanese descent
Sportspeople of Lebanese descent
Association football forwards
Association football midfielders
Ottawa Fury FC players
Carleton Ravens men's soccer players
Ottawa South United players
Cavalry FC draft picks
Cavalry FC players
Al Ansar FC players
FC Edmonton players
Première ligue de soccer du Québec players
League1 Ontario players
Canadian Premier League players
Canadian Premier League first-overall draft picks
Lebanon international footballers